Texas Country Reporter is a weekly syndicated television program, hosted and produced by Bob Phillips and Kelli Phillips, which airs in all twenty-two Texas media markets, generally on weekends, and nationally on the satellite/cable channel RFD-TV. As of November 2017, Bob Phillips had already taped more than two thousand episodes of the program. TCR airs 26 new episodes each season, from September through May. In the 2021-2022 season, the show is celebrating its 50th anniversary on the air. It is the longest running independently produced program in the nation. The show has been honored many times for the quality of its work including more than 30 EMMY awards.

Texas Country Reporter showcases Texas people and places, with an emphasis on rural areas and in a style similar to that of Charles Kuralt's On the Road for CBS News, who was Phillips' mentor when he first began his career. Originally called 4 Country Reporter, it debuted in 1972 on Dallas television station KDFW, Channel 4 and was first hosted by John Mclean, then Jeff Rosser, Joe Miser and finally Bob Philips. Phillips was a photographer and producer when the show first began. In 1986, Phillips left KDFW and began selling the show in syndication under the name Texas Country Reporter. In the Dallas market, KDFW did not pick up the syndicated version, but rival station WFAA did and named the show 8 Country Reporter. About this time Dairy Queen became the show's main sponsor, a move which allowed Phillips to be the spokesman for the chain in its advertising for the company's Texas-based restaurants. Other sponsors of the show have included Southwest Airlines, Capital Farm Credit, Mueller, Inc., Texas Farm Bureau Insurance, Texas Ford Dealers and others.

The show is independently syndicated with Phillips retaining half of the advertisements for regional sponsors; he appears in many of the regional ads, and the sponsors' logos adorn the back of his SUV. Each fall the program headlines a "Texas Country Reporter Festival" in Waxahachie south of Dallas, with some of the people who have been highlighted on the show in attendance. The festival has grown to become the largest one-day festival in Texas and attracts more than 50,000 people each year.Texas Country Reporter posts selected segments to its YouTube page, and some have been featured on local newscasts. Phillips has authored several books and video series over the years including two cook books, two Texas guide books and, in 2016, "The Texas Country Reporter Collection," a video series that includes more than 22 hours of stories from the program. A three-DVD highlights set, Go! Stay! Eat!, was released September 17, 2005. Two comprehensive video series have been released by Phillips' company including "Best of Volume 1" and "Best of Volume 2". "The Best of TCR Volume 3" is set to be released in 2018.

In 2021, Texas Country Reporter production company Phillips Productions was acquired by ''Texas Monthly.

Notes

Related links
 Official site, includes information on the people featured, events calendar and guide to Texas dialect.
 RFD-TV, features a brief history of the show in Phillips' own words.
 Texas Country Reporter's Channel on YouTube, featuring dozens of videos from the show.
 Texas Country Reporter on Facebook

1972 American television series debuts
1980s American television series
1990s American television series
2000s American television series
2010s American television series
First-run syndicated television programs in the United States
Television shows filmed in Texas
Television shows set in Texas
Texas culture
RFD-TV original programming